Protea glabra, also called the Clanwilliam sugarbush, is a flowering shrub belonging to the genus Protea.

Other vernacular names for this plant are chestnut sugarbush, Clanwilliam protea or kayang bush. In Afrikaans it is known as the kaiingbos, kaiing-suikerbos, kaiinghout, kayangbos, kreupelwaboom or tolletjiewaboom.

The tree's national number is 89.1.

Description
The bush grows up to 5m high and has a conical shape. It blooms from July to November. The plant is monoecious with both sexes in each flower.

Ecology
Pollination occurs through the action of birds and beetles. The seed is not stored in the woody fruit and is spread by the wind as soon as it is ripe. The plant grows in shallow sandstone soils or cracks in rock at altitudes of 500 - 1,500m. It is long-lived and can re-sprout after burning from a bole-shaped rootstock, although it normally grows in areas where there is low risk of wildfires.

Distribution
This species is endemic to South Africa. The plant is found in the Western Cape, on the Bokkeveld escarpment up to the Olifants River and the Koue Bokkeveld Mountains. Here, it is a widespread and common species with no severe threats.

References

glabra
Flora of the Cape Provinces